WYMR is an FM radio station licensed to the town of Culver, Indiana and broadcasting on a frequency of 98.3 MHz. It is owned by Kankakee Valley Broadcasting Company and airs a classic hits format branded as "MAX 98.3 FM".

References

External links
WYMR Max 98.3 Facebook

YMR (FM)
Classic hits radio stations in the United States
Radio stations established in 2015
2015 establishments in Indiana